The Coupe Charles Simon, commonly known as the Coupe de France, is a knockout cup competition in French football organized by the French Football Federation. The competition began in 1919 and is open to all amateur and professional football clubs in France, including clubs based in the overseas departments and territories. The competition culminates in May with the final, which is held at the Stade de France, the country's national stadium. Since 1927, the President of France has always attended the cup final and presented the trophy to the winning team's captain.

As of 2021, thirty-three clubs have lifted the trophy; Paris Saint-Germain have the most titles of these clubs with fourteen victories. They are followed by Marseille, who have ten, and Saint-Étienne, who have six. The current champions are Paris Saint-Germain, who defeated Monaco 2–0 in the 2021 final.

Finals

Performance by club

Notes

External links 
 Official page on FFF site
 Coupe de France page on LFP site
 Coupe de France Fixtures,Results and Detailed Statistics 
 France - List of Cup Finals, RSSSF.com

 
Lists of association football matches
Association football in France lists